John McFee (born September 9, 1950,  Santa Cruz, California) is an American singer, songwriter, guitarist, record producer, and multi-instrumentalist, and long-time member of The Doobie Brothers.

Biography
Some of McFee's early and non-Doobie Brothers work includes playing pedal steel guitar on Van Morrison's Tupelo Honey and Saint Dominic's Preview albums, and recording with many other artists, including Steve Miller on his Fly Like An Eagle album, the Grateful Dead on their From the Mars Hotel album, and Boz Scaggs, Emmylou Harris, Link Wray, Rick James, Janis Ian, Ricky Skaggs, The Brothers Four, Nick Lowe, Wanda Jackson, Bill Wyman of the Rolling Stones, Crystal Gayle, Mike Bloomfield, John Michael Montgomery, the Beach Boys, Norton Buffalo, Twiggy, Eikichi Yazawa, Chicago, and The Kendalls.

McFee played for a number of years with Huey Lewis in the group Clover and also played on Huey Lewis and the News' Sports and Hard at Play albums. McFee also played with Glen Campbell, for his Meet Glen Campbell live video performance.

McFee has played on a number of Elvis Costello's albums, beginning with all the lead and pedal steel guitar work on My Aim is True; he played lead guitar on "Alison". He has also continued to perform live with Costello periodically through the years.

In early 1979, McFee joined the Doobie Brothers, replacing departing guitarist Jeff Baxter. McFee was first featured on the Doobies' ninth studio album One Step Closer, which achieved RIAA platinum album status. Although he did not sing lead vocals on the song, he co-wrote the title track with Doobies drummer Keith Knudsen and Carlene Carter, as well as writing the Grammy-nominated instrumental "South Bay Strut" with co-drummer Chet McCracken. The album also reunited McFee with Doobies producer Ted Templeman, McFee having played on Templeman's first hit record as a producer (Van Morrison's "Wild Night" from the Tupelo Honey album).

After the Doobie Brothers disbanded in late 1982, McFee and Knudsen formed the country-rock group Southern Pacific, which also included ex-Creedence Clearwater Revival bassist Stu Cook, former Pablo Cruise vocalist David Jenkins, and keyboardist Kurt Howell. The group achieved a high level of success in the national country charts, starting with their first single reaching the top ten – a duet with Emmylou Harris on the Tom Petty composition "Thing About You", and going on to numerous other top ten records, including the number one songs "New Shade of Blue" and "Honey I Dare You", both of which McFee wrote. Southern Pacific was named New Country Group of the Year when they debuted and have been honored by having their name added to the Country Music Association's Walkway of Stars in Nashville, Tennessee.

In 1983, McFee played pedal steel guitar on the song "Honky Tonk Blues" from Huey Lewis and the News's Sports album, a song which was made famous by country legend Hank Williams Sr. In 1989, Southern Pacific had two songs – "Reno Bound" and "Any Way The Wind Blows" – appear in the Clint Eastwood film Pink Cadillac. McFee co-wrote both of the songs. The songs reached the top five on the country charts, and McFee can be heard on lead vocals on both tracks in the movie. Though McFee and Knudsen were committed to Southern Pacific, they co-wrote the song "Time Is Here And Gone" on the Doobies' 1989 reunion album Cycles with late Doobies percussionist Bobby LaKind. McFee has received numerous BMI awards as a songwriter. In 1990 Southern Pacific played a concert on "On Stage", McFee can be heard singing lead vocals on "Any Way The Wind Blows" and "I Go To Pieces".

By 1993, Southern Pacific had disbanded and both men had rejoined the Doobie Brothers. McFee and Knudsen contributed to 2000's Sibling Rivalry, on which McFee sings the lead vocal on the song "Angels of Madness", of which he was a co-writer, and McFee also co-wrote "Five Corners" with Patrick Simmons. In 2007, McFee assumed a role onstage as a relief lead vocalist for Tom Johnston  because of Johnston's throat ailment.

In 1995, McFee produced an album by Moby Grape founding member Peter Lewis. Moby Grape was a major influence on the Doobie Brothers, as well as on many other bands including Led Zeppelin and McFee's former group Clover. The collaboration of McFee (who, besides producing and engineering, contributed background vocals, guitars, violin, harmonica, mandolin, and pedal steel) and Lewis resulted in the album Peter Lewis, released by the German record label Taxim. Also making appearances on the album were former Eagle Randy Meisner, Creedence Clearwater Revival's Stu Cook, Doobie Brothers drummer Keith Knudsen, and Cornelius Bumpus (formerly with the Doobie Brothers and Steely Dan). The album received a rarely seen five star review from Rolling Stone magazine. McFee's long-term partnership with Knudsen ended with Knudsen's death from pneumonia in 2005.

In 2007, McFee produced and engineered Carlene Carter's album Stronger, playing almost all the instruments himself.

In 2010, he produced and engineered Hawaiianized by singer Pamela Polland. McFee also contributed on 8 string tenor ukulele, slack key guitar, acoustic and electric Hawaiian steel guitars, nylon string guitar, acoustic bass, keyboards, percussion, vocal arrangements, and background vocals for this project.

Also in 2010, the Doobie Brothers released World Gone Crazy, on which McFee contributed as recording engineer, as well as playing acoustic guitars, banjo, slide guitar, mandolin, percussion, violin, drums, electric guitars, vocals, and resonator guitars. The New York Post suggested that this album should be "Album of the Year", saying "Now they're back on track, with a smokin' mix of roadhouse boogies, classic rock and country."[3]

In 2011, McFee played acoustic and electric guitars, pedal steel, banjo, Dobro, mandolin, and slide guitar on French singer/songwriter Hugues Aufray's project, Troubador Since 1948. Aufray is widely known as a compatriot of Bob Dylan since the folk era, having translated many of Dylan's songs into French. He also wrote and popularized the classic ballad "Céline", which inspired Celine Dion's parents to choose this name for their daughter.

In 2014, McFee played violin on the band Chicago's single release, "Naked In The Garden Of Allah".

Also in 2014, the John Cowan album Sixty was released, produced by McFee. John Cowan was the lead vocalist and bass guitarist for the legendary progressive bluegrass group New Grass Revival, and in recent years has been touring and recording with the Doobie Brothers. The album "Sixty" features guest appearances by  Alison Krauss, Leon Russell, Ray Benson, Chris Hillman, Rodney Crowell, Bonnie Bramlett, Jim Messina, Alison Brown, Sam Bush,  John Jorgenson, Viktor Krauss, Bernie Leadon, Huey Lewis, Jay Dee Maness (Buck Owens and the Buckaroos), Josh Williams (Rhonda Vincent and the Rage), and others. On this project McFee also plays acoustic and electric guitars, pedal steel, Dobro, mandolin, violin, and other instruments as well as singing background vocals. Sixty was listed as one of the top Americana albums of 2014, and has been hailed as John Cowan's "masterpiece" album.

2014 also saw the release of the Doobie Brothers album Southbound, a Nashville-based project which features high-profile country artists collaborating with the Doobie Brothers on historic Doobie Brothers songs. Examples would be Blake Shelton performing "Listen To The Music" (with Hunter Hayes on guitar), Zac Brown Band doing "Black Water”, Toby Keith singing "Long Train Running" (with Huey Lewis on harmonica), Chris Young performing "China Grove", Brad Paisley doing "Rocking Down The Highway". On this project McFee can be heard on banjo, slide resonator guitar, pedal steel, violin, autoharp, and electric and acoustic guitars, as well as background vocals. This project also saw Michael McDonald reunited with his fellow Doobie Brothers.

In 2015 McFee teamed up with John Jorgenson (Desert Rose Band, Hellecasters, Elton John) to co-produce singer-songwriter Lewis Storey for the project Storey Road. Lewis Storey was nominated for the Horizon Award (Best New Artist) by the Academy of Country Music Awards in 1988 and has won several Songwriters Guild of America awards.

The year 2016 involved extensive touring with the Doobie Brothers, co-headlining with the group Journey, and with Rock and Roll Hall of Fame inductee Dave Mason on the bill as well. McFee, a long time admirer of Mason, was often seen sitting in with Mason and his band, particularly on "Dear Mr. Fantasy", "Feelin' Alright", and "All Along The Watchtower".

McFee was also involved with the artist Jeremiah Richey, on the recording project Northridge, on which McFee played electric guitar, pedal steel guitar, violin, Dobro, among other instruments, and was a co-writer of the song "Pretty Girl" produced by Rob Arthur, with whom a connection was formed when the Doobie Brothers toured with Peter Frampton – Rob Arthur playing keyboards with Frampton.

Also in 2016, McFee played on Timothy B. Schmit's solo project Leap Of Faith, playing violin on the first single from the recording, "Red Dirt Road". Although McFee had performed in concert with Schmit on numerous occasions, this project was the first time the two had worked together on a studio recording project. McFee also toured with Schmit in January 2017, as well as performing again on tour dates in November and December 2017.

In 2020, McFee was inducted into the Rock and Roll Hall of Fame as a member of The Doobie Brothers.

Discography

with The Doobie Brothers (incomplete)
One Step Closer
No Nukes
In Harmony: A Sesame Street Record
Farewell Tour
Best Of The Doobies, Vol. 2
 Listen to the Music: The Very Best of The Doobie Brothers
Rockin' down the Highway: The Wildlife Concert
Best of the Doobie Brothers Live
 Greatest Hits
 Doobie's Choice
Sibling Rivalry
Long Train Runnin’: 1971–2000
Live at Wolf Trap
 The Very Best of The Doobie Brothers
World Gone Crazy
 Live at the Greek Theater 1982
 Southbound
  Cycles
  Brotherhood
  Liberté

with others (incomplete)
Hugues Aufray – Troubador Since 1948
Mike Bloomfield – Bloomfield: A Retrospective
Norton Buffalo – Lovin' In The Valley Of The Moon
Norton Buffalo – Desert Horizon
Carlene Carter – Musical Shapes
Carlene Carter – Two Sides to Every Woman
Carlene Carter – Stronger
Chicago – Naked In The Garden Of Allah
Elvis Costello – My Aim Is True
Elvis Costello – Taking Liberties
Elvis Costello – Almost Blue
Elvis Costello – The Very Best Of Elvis Costello
Elvis Costello – The Delivery Man
John Cowan – Sixty
Crystal Gayle – Straight To The Heart
Crystal Gayle – The Best Of Crystal Gayle
The Grateful Dead – Grateful Dead from the Mars Hotel
The Grateful Dead – Beyond Description
Emmylou Harris – White Shoes
Emmylou Harris – All I Intended To Be
Janis Ian – Present Company
Wanda Jackson – Heart Trouble
Rick James – Throwin' Down
Rick James – Anthology
The Kendalls – Movin' Train
Nicolette Larson – Radioland
Nicolette Larson – All Dressed Up and No Place to Go
Huey Lewis and the News – Sports
Huey Lewis and the News – Hard at Play
Huey Lewis and the News – Weather
Peter Lewis – Peter Lewis
Nick Lowe – Jesus Of Cool aka Pure Pop for Now People
Steve Miller – Fly Like An Eagle
Steve Miller – Greatest Hits: 1974–78
John Michael Montgomery – What I Do The Best
John Michael Montgomery – The Very Best Of John Michael Montgomery
Van Morrison – Tupelo Honey
Van Morrison – Saint Dominic's Preview
Van Morrison – The Essential Van Morrison
Van Morrison – At the Movies: Soundtrack Hits
Jeremiah Richey – Northridge
Boz Scaggs – Moments
Ricky Scaggs – Solid Ground
Timothy B. Schmit – Leap Of Faith
Southern Pacific – Southern Pacific
Southern Pacific – Killbilly Hill
Southern Pacific – County Line
Southern Pacific – Zuma
Southern Pacific – Greatest Hits
Southern Pacific – Pink Cadillac Original Motion Picture Soundtrack
Lewis Storey – Storey Road
Twiggy – Please Get My Name Right
Link Wray – Be What You Want To
Bill Wyman  – Stone Alone
Eikichi Yazawa – Anytime Woman
Eikichi Yazawa – Rock 'n' Roll
Eikichi Yazawa – Subway Express

References

External links
 

1950 births
Living people
Musicians from Santa Cruz, California
Pedal steel guitarists
American rock guitarists
American male guitarists
The Doobie Brothers members
Southern Pacific (band) members
Clover (band) members
Lead guitarists
Guitarists from California
20th-century American guitarists
20th-century American male musicians